is a Japanese anime television series created by Yasuchika Nagaoka, Anime International Company and Project Godannar, which consists of IMAGICA Entertainment, Taki Corporation, KlockWorx, NTT Data Contents Planing, Sojitz and Oriental Light and Magic. The series is produced by AIC and OLM, with Nagaoka serving as director and Hiroyuki Kawasaki as its main scriptwriter. The first season aired in Japan from October 1 to December 24, 2003, on AT-X. A second season later aired from April 5 to June 29, 2004. Both seasons were licensed by ADV Films for North America, but was licensed by Sentai Filmworks in 2013.

Plot

The Mimetic Beasts return after five years on Goh and Anna's wedding day. Goh and Dannar are called to action, leaving Anna at the altar.

As Goh struggles in his battle against the Mimetic Beasts, Anna stumbles upon a sealed robot called Neo Okusaer. She is able to activate and pilot the Neo Okusaer to save her fiancé by merging it with the Dannar to activate the Godannar's Twin Drive.

Over the course of the series, humanity is threatened by the Insania virus, which is spread by the Mimetic Beasts. All of humanity is infected, but as the virus is stimulated by human hormones, especially those released in great quantities during combat, the virus only adversely affects robot pilots since they come into close contact with the beasts on a regular basis: The virus has the effect of transforming human males into Mimetic Beasts, while females are immune unless they naturally generate large amounts of male hormones.

Second season
The pilots of Dannar Base struggle to balance the need to fight the Mimetic Beasts with the increasing danger of further infection by the Insania virus. Eventually, it is discovered that Mira, Goh's former combat partner and lover who was trapped inside a Mimetic beast for five years, is the source of the vaccine humanity needs.

Characters

Dannar Base
It is a robot base from Japan.

Goh is the male protagonist of Godannar. At the beginning of the series, he rescues Anna in a battle with the Mimetic Beasts. Five years later, Goh and Anna have fallen deeply in love and are to be married just as the Mimetic Beasts begin to move once again. Although he is in love with Anna, referring to her as the only woman for him, he feels conflicting emotions towards other women, such as when Mira reawakens and Shizuru is killed. when Anna leaves Dannar Base due to her guilt and jealousy over Mira, he sets aside his feelings for Mira and chooses to be loyal to Anna. He is infected by the Insania virus from exposure in repeated battles with the Mimetic Beasts. His body is later covered in a cocoon, waiting to emerge as a Beast and so is placed in suspended animation for seven years until he is given a cure via an injection of the vaccine made from Mira and Morimoto's son's DNA, which reverses the transformation.

/
Anna is the female protagonist. An emergency call came from Dannar Base requesting Goh's assistance interrupts their wedding ceremony. She becomes the pilot of Neo Okusaer and later Go Okusaer, GoDannar's original partner. She becomes a surrogate mother to Lou and befriends and mentors Mira before learning of Mira's past with Goh. It is revealed through her conversation with Hidebo that Anna's desire to become a robot pilot came from her childhood. She, Goh, and Lou form the Godannar Triple Drive when Celleblader fuses with Godannar. At the end of the series, Anna and Goh remarry.

/Miracle "Mira" Ackerman
Mira is the original pilot of Neo Okusaer. She is Goh's former combat partner and lover, as well as Max's ex-girlfriend, until she is apparently killed in battle. Five years later, Mira awakens without her memory. After regaining her full memories, she resumes her old duties as pilot of the Neo Okusaer. She tries to steal Goh from Anna at the end of the series by attempting to kill him to stop his transformation, a discussion with Anna makes her realize that Anna is Goh's true love and partner and she respectfully steps aside. She cannot die from her wounds as her prolonged time in the infected Club Mariner, which caused her DNA to evolve constantly and repair her body from even the worst physical injuries. Her DNA is developed as a cure for the infection caused by the Mimetic Beasts. She reveals at the end that her name is short for Miracle.

Kiriko is Anna's mother and Goh's boss. She developed the Dannar project with her husband Tatsuya.

 Shizuru is the pilot of Core Gunner. She is one of Goh's best friends and was secretly in love with him, but is unable to confess these feelings due to his relationship with Mira and later his marriage to Anna. She develops a close friendship with Anna and Goh's younger brother Shinobu. Shizuru is killed by a swarm of Type 19 Mimetic Beasts, but is resurrected by Mira. She becomes the general manager of Dannar Base while Kiriko Aoi and Commander Kagemaru search for a cure to the Insania virus.

Tetsuya is Shizuru's partner and G-Gunner's co-pilot. He spends most of the series recovering from injuries sustained in the battle from the first episode. He leaves Dannar Base to secretly train with Tatsuya. He later returns in the final episodes piloting both the G-Zero Gunner and Club Mariner for the grand battle against the Super Mimetic Beast. At the end of the series he is the vice commander of Dannar Base and still remains a pilot.

A Japan Base (later Dannar Base) pilot.

/
Shinobu is Goh's younger brother who lives with Goh and Anna. He becomes the pilot of the Neo Diver.

 Kagemaru is the commander of Danner Base. At the end of the series, he turns down a promotion from the commissioners to become a robot pilot.

Tatsuya is Anna's father. He left his family when Anna was a small child and disguised himself as different people to watch over Anna and Dannar Base. He and Kiriko were the founders of the Dannar project. He appeared during the final episodes to aid Danner Base against the Super Mimetic Beast. He tries to leave again at the end but is interrupted by Kiriko.

/
Konami is one of the two operators of the main ship's console. She becomes a pilot of Alpha Tiger at the end of the series alongside Momochi.

/
Momoko is one of the two operators of the main ship's console. She becomes a pilot of Alpha Tiger at the end of the series alongside Konami.

/
Shibakusa is the widowed head mechanic. He runs a ramen shop with Tonko in the end of the series seven years later until the base is repaired, when they resume their duties.

/
A female mechanic.

Nanae is one of the mechanics at Dannar Base. She becomes infected by the virus after being eaten by a Type 13 Mimetic beast early in the series and becomes a carrier. She has a relationship with Morimoto, another mechanic at the base, and marries him. Her children become second generation carriers, whose DNA has the ability to repair the infected DNA caused by the Insania Virus.

Morimoto is a mechanic at the Dannar base who marries Hayashi and has three children.

Sugiyama is the second head mechanic.

A mechanic.

Anna's pet cat.

Union Base
It is a robot base from England.

Knight is one of the pilots of the giant British robot Dragliner. According to Ellis, he is not infected by the virus because he has more feminine hormones due to his perverted behavior.

Ellis is the other pilot of Dragliner. Knight and Ellis refer to each other as brother and sister, though they are not related by blood. Ellis is in love with Knight and feels unable to express it due to their sibling connection and so acts jealous and frustrated with his constant skirt chasing. :

Silicon Base
It is a robot base from North America.

Shadow is the pilot of the giant American robot Genesister and the partner of Luna, whom she secretly loves. She is the only female to be severely affected by the virus due to her male hormones, but survives after her fight with Rose Type.

Luna is the co-pilot of Genesister and the partner of Shadow, whom she loves.

Dino Base
It is a robot base from China.

Moukaku is the pilot of the giant Chinese robot Goddiner. After fighting Type 29 he becomes the second case of a full-blown infection by the Insania virus, like Max, and Knight is forced to kill him.

Shukuyu is the co-pilot of the giant Chinese robot Goddiner. She tries to help Moukaku fight the virus, but he ejects her out of Goddiner before Knight destroys him.

Vega Base
It is a robot base from Russia.

/Ecaterina
Ekaterina is the wealthy and well-endowed pilot of the giant Russian robot Volspina.

Kukrachyov is the co-pilot of Volspina.

Cosmo Base

Lou's father, and a Cosmo Base commander.

Menage Zero
/Lou Lowe
Lou is a young orphan girl taken in by Goh and Anna and the pilot of Cosmo Diver. She was once an operator for the orbital space station that monitors the Earth for the presence of Type 17 Mimetic beasts, an is the lone survivor when the space station is destroyed. She becomes obsessed with becoming a robot pilot to avenge her father's death. At the end of the series, she continues to pilot Celleblader to fight the Mimetic Beasts, becoming a Menage Zero after Ken. She returns for a short while to witness Goh and Anna's wedding.

Ken is the rogue robot pilot of the Blade Gainer who makes it his life mission to defeat the Type 18 Mimetic beasts after his wife's death. He later takes Lou in when she begs Ken to teach her to be a pilot. He becomes infected by the virus, and ejects Lou from the Celleblader out of the Gainer before he dies in his last battle and warns her she will become like him if she fights for revenge. He attacks the Super Mimetic Beast to reveal its weakness to Godannar to finish it off.

Rosa is the previous pilot of Celleblader. She saved Ken from a pack of Type 18 Mimetic Beasts several years ago at the cost of her life. She and Celleblader were absorbed into one of the Mimetic Beasts until Ken killed it. Although Celleblader was intact, Rosa was not inside the cockpit when Ken looked inside, suggesting that she was absorbed by the Mimetic Beast during her capture.

Gakazono High School

A 2nd year high school student, and Anna's classmate.

A 2nd year high school student, and Anna's classmate.

A 2nd year high school student, and Anna's classmate.

A 2nd year high school male student.

A 2nd year high school male student.

A 2nd year high school male student.

A 2nd year high school male student.

Episodes

Season one

Season two

Reception
Stig Høgset of T.H.E.M. Anime Reviews praised season one for the animation, but criticized the story in later episodes.The seven volumes of the ADV Films release were graded by Chris Beveridge in his reviews at Mania.com, and ranged from A− for the first two volumes to B for volumes five and six. Theron Martin of Anime News Network gave a generally favorable review of the first volume, though he commented that Hilary Haag "gets a little too shrill at a couple of points". Mike Toole has complimented the director Yasushi Nagaoka and some of the voice actors, including the Japanese and English voices for Goh and Anna.

Adaptations
A series of 4-volume novel was published by Kadokawa under the MF Bunko J imprint:
Vol. 1 (ISBN 978-4-84011049-5, 2004-03-25)
Vol. 2 (ISBN 978-4-84011074-7, 2004-04-24)
Vol. 3 (ISBN 978-4-84011091-4, 2004-05-25)
Vol. 4 (ISBN 978-4-84011106-5, 2004-06-25)

A series of 2-volume comic was published by Kadokawa under the Dengeki Comics EX imprint, authored by Seta Noriyasu:
Vol. 1 (ISBN 978-4-84022718-6, 2004-06-10)
Vol. 2 (ISBN 978-4-84023008-7, 2005-03-10)

References

External links
AIC page: 1st season, Second Season, English
Imagica TV page
Tokyo MX page
ADV Films site
Sentai Filmworks site

2003 anime television series debuts
ADV Films
Anime International Company
Anime with original screenplays
Comedy anime and manga
Dengeki Comics
MF Bunko J
OLM, Inc.
Romance anime and manga
Sentai Filmworks
Sojitz
Super robot anime and manga